Jones Mill (also known as Jones Mills) is an unincorporated community and census-designated place (CDP) in Hot Spring County, Arkansas, United States. It was first listed as a CDP in the 2020 census with a population of 411.

Jones Mill has a post office with ZIP code 72105.

History
Jones Mill formerly had three major Reynolds Metals Company plants: The Jones Mills Reduction Plant, the Malvern Cable Plant and the Hot Spring Rolling Mill. The United States War Department in October 1941 announced the Remmel Dam Aluminum Plant would be one of four defense plants built in Arkansas. Reynolds Metals bought the plant after the war.

In September 1985, Reynolds Metals announced it would close its Jones Mills plant and the Patterson Reduction Plant, at Gum Springs, Arkansas, by mid-October.

After the permanent closures, Reynolds Metals reported it was then operating at 72 percent of its revised reduction capacity.

The cable plant was later sold and currently is owned by General Cable Corporation. Hot Spring Rolling Mill is now operated by Reynolds Packaging Group, a unit of Reynolds Group Holdings. The U.S. War Department's reduction plant was named for nearby Remmel Dam, a hydroelectric dam operated by Arkansas Power & Light Co. (now known as Entergy Arkansas.) Reynolds Metals renamed it, using the older spelling of the community's name, Jones Mills. The cable mill was named for the nearby city of Malvern. The rolling mill is named for Hot Spring County.

Demographics

2020 census

Note: the US Census treats Hispanic/Latino as an ethnic category. This table excludes Latinos from the racial categories and assigns them to a separate category. Hispanics/Latinos can be of any race.

Education 
Public education for early childhood, elementary and secondary school students is provided by Magnet Cove School District, which leads to graduation from Magnet Cove High School.

Infrastructure

Transportation
Jones Mill is connected on road by U.S. Route 270 and Arkansas Highway 51. Arkansas Midland Railroad, operating over the route of the original Hot Springs Railroad, provides railroad freight service to Hot Springs and Malvern, and links to the Union Pacific Railroad in Malvern.

References

External links
 Jones Mills (Hot Spring County) Encyclopedia of Arkansas
 Remmel Dam Encyclopedia of Arkansas 
 Magnet Cove School District
 Malvern Amtrak Station 
GM Foundry

Census-designated places in Hot Spring County, Arkansas
Unincorporated communities in Hot Spring County, Arkansas
Unincorporated communities in Arkansas
Census-designated places in Arkansas
Company towns in Arkansas